Broughton Archipelago Provincial Park is a provincial park in British Columbia, Canada, located in the Broughton Archipelago in the Queen Charlotte Strait region of the Central Coast.

External links

Broughton Archipelago Provincial Park at BC Parks

Provincial parks of British Columbia
Central Coast of British Columbia
1992 establishments in British Columbia
Marine parks of Canada